Thames Valley Park (also known as TVP) is a high-tech business park adjacent to the River Thames on the eastern outskirts of Reading in Berkshire, England.  Companies based at the park include BBC Radio Berkshire, Steria, SGI, Regus, Websense, Oracle, Microsoft, OpenText and ING Direct. The site had formerly been Earley Power Station, which had been operational from the early 1940s until the early 1970s.

Transport links
TVP is at the northern terminus of the A3290 (formerly part of the A329(M)) giving good connections to the M4 and A4. Originally the A329(M) was supposed to follow the river west from the park towards a junction with Vastern Road. A free bus service links TVP to Reading railway station, and the latter has good connections for London and Heathrow Airport.

A railway station to serve the park had been proposed in the 1998 Reading Borough Local Plan, but this was never built.

References

External links 

Official travel information site

Business parks of England
Economy of Reading, Berkshire
High-technology business districts in the United Kingdom
Information technology company headquarters in the United Kingdom
Sonning
Parks and open spaces on the River Thames
Parks and open spaces in Reading, Berkshire
Wokingham
Year of establishment missing